"Tití Me Preguntó" (English: "Auntie Asked Me") is a  song by Puerto Rican rapper Bad Bunny. The song samples "No Te Puedo Olvidar" by the Dominican musician Anthony "El Mayimbe" Santos and can be heard throughout the song. It was originally released on May 6, 2022, by Rimas Entertainment as the fourth track of Bad Bunny's fifth studio album Un Verano Sin Ti (2022) before being released on June 1, 2022, as the third single from the album. The song was written by Bunny with MAG handling the production. The genre-fusing shapeshifting song combines elements of dembow, latin trap, psychedelia, and bachata.

Promotion and release
On May 2, 2022, Bad Bunny announced his fifth studio album, Un Verano Sin Ti, on which "Tití Me Preguntó" appears at number four on the tracklist. On May 6, 2022, "Tití Me Preguntó" was released alongside the rest of Un Verano Sin Ti through Rimas Entertainment before releasing it on June 1, 2022 as the third single from the album upon the release of its music video on YouTube.

Commercial performance
Following the releasing of its parent album, "Tití Me Preguntó" charted at number 5 on the US Billboard Hot 100 dated May 21, 2022, becoming the second-highest charting track from Un Verano Sin Ti behind "Moscow Mule", which peaked at number 4. Additionally, it peaked at number 1 on the US Hot Latin Songs chart as well as peaking at number 4 on the Billboard Global 200 upon the issue date of June 11, 2022. Upon the issue date of May 29, 2022, "Tití Me Preguntó" reached number one in Spain.

Audio visualizer
A 360° audio visualizer for the song was uploaded to YouTube on May 6, 2022, along with the other audio visualizer videos of the songs that appeared on Un Verano Sin Ti.

Music video
The music video for "Tití Me Preguntó" was released on YouTube on June 1, 2022. It was mostly shot in New York City. As of December 2022, the music video has accumulated over 570 million views on YouTube.

Charts

Weekly charts

Year-end charts

Certifications

See also
List of Billboard Hot 100 top-ten singles in 2022
List of Billboard Hot Latin Songs and Latin Airplay number ones of 2022

References

External links
 
 

2022 songs
2022 singles
Bad Bunny songs
Songs written by Bad Bunny